Melville is a seaside resort village on the South Coast of KwaZulu-Natal, South Africa. 

Melville is a quiet and small seaside village regarded as something of an extension of Port Shepstone with no shopping centre or public transport to speak of with very little to no developments in the area and has wild banana trees (hence it has a beach called Banana Beach) and abundant indigenous vegetation. Nearby shopping centres are in Port Shepstone and Hibberdene.

Geography 
Melville lies exactly halfway between Port Shepstone, the economic hub of the South Coast and Hibberdene with it lying 12 km south-west of Hibberdene and 11 km north-east of Port Shepstone as well as 107 km south-west of the city of Durban.

Furthermore it lies between the small seaside villages of Pumula and Sunwich Port, with Pumula to the north and Sunwich Port to the south. 

It lies on the R102 to Hibberdene and Durban to the north and Port Shepstone to the south.

Tourism 
Melville has two beaches, Melville Beach and Banana Beach. As a resort village, it consists of a few recreational areas such as the Banana Beach Holiday Resort, Illanga Resort & Caravan Park and the Lalanathi Caravan & Camping Park.

Nearby and larger beaches within the Lower South Coast are in Hibberdene, Ramsgate, St Michael's-on-Sea, Uvongo, Margate and Marina Beach.

References

Populated coastal places in South Africa
Tourist attractions in KwaZulu-Natal
Populated places in the Ray Nkonyeni Local Municipality